Tanjung Sauh is a port under construction on the island of Batam, within Sijori Growth Triangle and will be able to handle shipments through the Malacca Straits without transshipment from Singapore.  This project directly competes with Singapore's ports.  It is planned with 4 million TEU capacity, for completion in 2015.  It complements Batu Ampar port on Batam, which is being expanded for 700,000 TEU.

References

Ports and harbours of Indonesia
Batam
Buildings and structures in the Riau Islands